= Blues Cousins =

Russian blues band

- Origin: Moscow, Russia
- Genres: Blues
- Years active: 1993–present
- Labels: Landy Star Music, Dialog Music, Alf Music
- Members: Levan Lomidze; Slava Ignatov; Konstantin Kirilenko
- Past members: Sergey Patrushiev; Dmitry Chestnyh

Blues Cousins is a Russian blues band. Formed in 1993, they are said to be the "best Blues band in Moscow" Blues Cousins is known for their energetic performances and significant contributions to the blues genre. The band gained international recognition after winning the Best Blues Band award at the Blues Sur Seine festival in France in 2000, competing against 57 bands from around the world.

== CD/Albums ==
- Blues Cousins (1996)
- The Dream (1999)
- Hoochie Coochie Man (2001)
- Moscow Boogie (2002)
- Rain (2003)
- Live 2003 (2004)
- Live at Sunbanks blues festival (2004)
- Alive in the USA (2005)
- KGB Blues (2011)
- 30 Most Slow Blues (2017)
- I Was Born in Georgia (2017)
- Sleepless Night (2018)
- I've Got No Mojo (2020)
- Let's Dance (2020)
- The Shadow (2020)
- Poison (2021)
- Over and Over (2021)
- Ain't No Easy (2023)
- Call Me (2025)

== Performances ==
- “Blues Sur Seine” festival, France
- Sunbanks Blues Festival, Washington, U.S.A.
